Privacy is the ability of an individual or group to seclude themselves or information about themselves, and thereby express themselves selectively.

Etymology of the word privacy: the word privacy is derived from the Latin word "privatus" which means set apart from what is public, personal and belonging to oneself, and not to the state.

The domain of privacy partially overlaps with security, which can include the concepts of appropriate use and protection of information. Privacy may also take the form of bodily integrity. The right not to be subjected to unsanctioned invasions of privacy by the government, corporations, or individuals is part of many countries' privacy laws, and in some cases, constitutions.

The concept of universal individual privacy is a modern concept primarily associated with Western culture, particularly British and North American, and remained virtually unknown in some cultures until recent times. Now, most cultures recognize the ability of individuals to withhold certain parts of personal information from wider society. With the rise of technology, the debate regarding privacy has shifted from a bodily sense to a digital sense. As the world has become digital, there have been conflicts regarding the legal right to privacy and where it is applicable. In most countries, the right to a reasonable expectation to digital privacy has been extended from the original right to privacy, and many countries, notably the US, under its agency, the Federal Trade Commission, and those within the European Union (EU), have passed acts that further protect digital privacy from public and private entities and grant additional rights to users of technology.

With the rise of the Internet, there has been an increase in the prevalence of social bots, causing political polarization and harassment. Online harassment has also spiked, particularly with teenagers, which has consequently resulted in multiple privacy breaches. Selfie culture, the prominence of networks like Facebook and Instagram, location technology, and the use of advertisements and their tracking methods also pose threats to digital privacy.

Through the rise of technology and immensity of the debate regarding privacy, there have been various conceptions of privacy, which include the right to be let alone as defined in "The Right to Privacy", the first U.S. publication discussing privacy as a legal right, to the theory of the privacy paradox, which describes the notion that users' online may say they are concerned about their privacy, but in reality, are not. Along with various understandings of privacy, there are actions that reduce privacy, the most recent classification includes processing of information, sharing information, and invading personal space to get private information, as defined by Daniel J. Solove. Conversely, in order to protect a user's privacy, multiple steps can be taken, specifically through practicing encryption, anonymity, and taking further measures to bolster the security of their data.

History

Privacy has historical roots in ancient Greek philosophical discussions. The most well-known of these was Aristotle's distinction between two spheres of life: the public sphere of the polis, associated with political life, and the private sphere of the oikos, associated with domestic life. In the United States, more systematic treatises of privacy did not appear until the 1890s, with the development of privacy law in America.

Technology

As technology has advanced, the way in which privacy is protected and violated has changed with it. In the case of some technologies, such as the printing press or the Internet, the increased ability to share information can lead to new ways in which privacy can be breached. It is generally agreed that the first publication advocating privacy in the United States was the 1890 article by Samuel Warren and Louis Brandeis, "The Right to Privacy", and that it was written mainly in response to the increase in newspapers and photographs made possible by printing technologies.

In 1948, 1984, written by George Orwell, was published. A classic dystopian novel, 1984 describes the life of Winston Smith in 1984, located in Oceania, a totalitarian state. The all-controlling Party, the party in power led by Big Brother, is able to control power through mass surveillance and limited freedom of speech and thought. George Orwell provides commentary on the negative effects of totalitarianism, particularly on privacy and censorship. Parallels have been drawn between 1984 and modern censorship and privacy, a notable example being that large social media companies, rather than the government, are able to monitor a user's data and decide what is allowed to be said online through their censorship policies, ultimately for monetary purposes.

In the 1960s, people began to consider how changes in technology were bringing changes in the concept of privacy. Vance Packard's The Naked Society was a popular book on privacy from that era and led US discourse on privacy at that time. In addition, Alan Westin's Privacy and Freedom shifted the debate regarding privacy from a physical sense, how the government controls a person's body (i.e. Roe v. Wade) and other activities such as wiretapping and photography. As important records became digitized, Westin argued that personal data was becoming too accessible and that a person should have complete jurisdiction over their data, laying the foundation for the modern discussion of privacy.

New technologies can also create new ways to gather private information. For example, in the United States, it was thought that heat sensors intended to be used to find marijuana-growing operations would be acceptable. Contrary to popular opinion, in 2001 in Kyllo v. United States (533 U.S. 27) it was decided that the use of thermal imaging devices that can reveal previously unknown information without a warrant does indeed constitute a violation of privacy. In 2019, after developing a corporate rivalry in competing voice-recognition software, Apple and Amazon required employees to listen to intimate moments and faithfully transcribe the contents.

Police and government

Police and citizens often conflict on what degree the police can intrude a citizen's digital privacy. For instance, in 2012, the Supreme Court ruled unanimously in United States v. Jones (565 U.S. 400), in the case of Antoine Jones who was arrested of drug possession using a GPS tracker on his car that was placed without a warrant, that warrantless tracking infringes the Fourth Amendment. The Supreme Court also justified that there is some "reasonable expectation of privacy" in transportation since the reasonable expectation of privacy had already been established under Griswold v. Connecticut (1965). The Supreme Court also further clarified that the Fourth Amendment did not only pertain to physical instances of intrusion but also digital instances, and thus United States v. Jones became a landmark case.

In 2014, the Supreme Court ruled unanimously in Riley v. California (573 U.S. 373), where David Leon Riley was arrested after he was pulled over for driving on expired license tags when the police searched his phone and discovered that he was tied to a shooting, that searching a citizen's phone without a warrant was an unreasonable search, a violation of the Fourth Amendment. The Supreme Court concluded that the cell phones contained personal information different than trivial items, and went beyond to state that information stored on the cloud was not necessarily a form of evidence. Riley v. California evidently became a landmark case, protecting the digital protection of citizen's privacy when confronted with the police.

A recent notable occurrence of the conflict between law enforcement and a citizen in terms of digital privacy has been in the 2018 case, Carpenter v. United States (585 U.S. ). In this case, the FBI used cell phone records without a warrant to arrest Timothy Ivory Carpenter on multiple charges, and the Supreme Court ruled that the warrantless search of cell phone records violated the Fourth Amendment, citing that the Fourth Amendment protects "reasonable expectations of privacy" and that information sent to third parties still falls under data that can be included under "reasonable expectations of privacy".

Beyond law enforcement, many interactions between the government and citizens have been revealed either lawfully or unlawfully, specifically through whistleblowers. One notable example is Edward Snowden, who released multiple operations related to the mass surveillance operations of the National Security Agency (NSA), where it was discovered that the NSA continues to breach the security of millions of people, mainly through mass surveillance programs whether it was collecting great amounts of data through third party private companies, hacking into other embassies or frameworks of international countries, and various breaches of data, which prompted a culture shock and stirred international debate related to digital privacy.

Internet

In the European Union (EU), personal data, in whatever form it is received, data protection rights must be respected by law. This also applies to companies based outside of the EU which conduct business inside the EU.

Historically, the United States has disparate state and federal laws governing Internet privacy, with much left unregulated. While data privacy protection laws can grant individuals rights to control their data, enforcement is increasingly complex. A variety of data may be covered by specific laws, such as  HIPAA, FCRA, FERPA, GLBA, ECPA, COPPA, and VPPA.

Legal discussions of Internet privacy
The Internet has brought new concerns about privacy in an age where computers can permanently store records of everything: "where every online photo, status update, Twitter post and blog entry by and about us can be stored forever", writes law professor and author Jeffrey Rosen.

One of the first instances of privacy being discussed in a legal manner was in 1914, the Federal Trade Commission (FTC) was established, under the Federal Trade Commission Act, whose initial goal was to promote competition amongst businesses and prohibit unfair and misleading businesses. However, since the 1970s, the FTC has become involved in privacy law and enforcement, the first instance being the FTC's implementation and enforcement of the Fair Credit Reporting Act (FCRA), which regulates how credit card bureaus can use a client's data and grants consumer's further credit card rights. In addition to the FCRA, the FTC has implemented various other important acts that protect consumer privacy. For example, the FTC passed the Children's Online Privacy Protection Act (COPPA) of 1998, which regulates services geared towards children under the age of thirteen, and the Red Flags Rule, passed in 2010, which warrants that companies have measures to protect clients against identity theft, and if clients become victims of identity theft, that there are steps to alleviate the consequences of identity theft.

In 2018, the European Union (EU)'s General Data Protection Regulation (GDPR) went into effect, a privacy legislation that replaced the Data Protection Directive of 1995. The GDPR requires how consumers within the EU must have complete and concise knowledge about how companies use their data and have the right to gain and correct data that a companies stores regarding them, enforcing stricter privacy legislations compared to the Data Protection Directive of 1995.

Social networking

Several online social network sites (OSNs) are among the top 10 most visited websites globally. Facebook for example, as of August 2015, was the largest social-networking site, with nearly 2.7 billion members, who upload over 4.75 billion pieces of content daily. While Twitter is significantly smaller with 316 million registered users, the US Library of Congress recently announced that it will be acquiring and permanently storing the entire archive of public Twitter posts since 2006.

A review and evaluation of scholarly work regarding the current state of the value of individuals' privacy of online social networking show the following results: "first, adults seem to be more concerned about potential privacy threats than younger users; second, policy makers should be alarmed by a large part of users who underestimate risks of their information privacy on OSNs; third, in the case of using OSNs and its services, traditional one-dimensional privacy approaches fall short". This is exacerbated by deanonymization research indicating that personal traits such as sexual orientation, race, religious and political views, personality, or intelligence can be inferred based on a wide variety of digital footprints, such as samples of text, browsing logs, or Facebook Likes.

Intrusions of social media privacy are known to affect employment in the United States. Microsoft reports that 75 percent of U.S. recruiters and human-resource professionals now do online research about candidates, often using information provided by search engines, social-networking sites, photo/video-sharing sites, personal web sites and blogs, and Twitter. They also report that 70 percent of U.S. recruiters have rejected candidates based on internet information. This has created a need by many candidates to control various online privacy settings in addition to controlling their online reputations, the conjunction of which has led to legal suits against both social media sites and US employers.

Selfie culture

Selfies are popular today. A search for photos with the hashtag #selfie retrieves over 23 million results on Instagram and 51 million with the hashtag #me. However, due to modern corporate and governmental surveillance, this may pose a risk to privacy. In a research study which takes a sample size of 3763, researchers found that for users posting selfies on social media, women generally have greater concerns over privacy than men, and that users' privacy concerns inversely predict their selfie behavior and activity.

Online harassment

After the 1999 Columbine Shooting, where violent video games and music were thought to be one of the main influences on the killers, some states began to pass anti-bullying laws where some included cyber-bullying laws. The suicide of 13-year-old Megan Meier, where Meier was harassed on Myspace, prompted Missouri to pass anti-harassment laws though the perpetrators were later declared innocent. Through the rise of smartphones and the rise in popularity with social media such as Facebook and Instagram, messaging, online forums, gaming communities, and email, online harassment continued to grow. 18-year-old Jessica Logan committed suicide in 2009 after her boyfriend sent explicit photos of her to various teenagers in  different high schools, where she was then harassed through Myspace, which led to her school passing anti-harassment laws. Further notable occurrences where digital privacy was invaded include the death of Tyler Clementi and Amanda Todd, whose death instigated Canadian funding towards studies on bullying and legislation regarding cyber-bullying to be passed, but problems regarding the lack of protection for users were risen, by Todd's mother herself, since this bill allowed for companies to completely access a user's data.

All U.S. states have now passed laws regarding online harassment. 15% of adolescents aged 12–18 have been subject to cyberbullying, according to a 2017 report conducted by the National Center for Education Statistics and Bureau of Justice. In 2018 16% of high schoolers were subject to cyberbullying according to the CDC's 2019 Youth Risk Behavior Surveillance System.

Bot accounts

Bots originate from the 1980s, where they were known as an IRC (Internet Relayed Chat) which served essential purposes such as stating the date and time and over time now expand to other purposes, such as flagging copyright on articles.

Forms of social media, such as Twitter, Facebook, and Instagram, have a prevalent activity of social bots, different than IRC bots, representing accounts that are not human and perform autonomous behavior to some degree. Bots, especially those with malicious intent, became most prevalent in the 2016 U.S. presidential election, where both the Trump and Clinton campaign had millions of bots essentially working on their account to influence the election. A subsection of these bots would target and assault certain journalists, causing journalists to stop reporting on matters since they dreaded further harassment.  In the same election, Russian Twitter bots, presenting themselves as Midwestern swing-voter Republicans were used to amplify and spread misinformation. In October 2020, data scientist Emilio Ferrara found that 19% of tweets related to the 2016 election were generated by bots. Following the election, A 2017 study revealed that nearly 48 million Twitter accounts are bots. Furthermore, it was found that approximately 33% of tweets related to Brexit were produced by bots. Data indicates that the use of bots has increased since the 2016 election, and AI-driven bots are becoming hard to detect, and soon will be able to emulate human-like behavior, by being able to comment, submit comments regarding policy, etc. affecting political debate, outcomes of an election, and a user's perception of those online and the humans they interact with.

Although bots have been used in a negative context when politics are described, many bots have been used to protect against online harassment. For example, since 2020, Facebook researchers have been developing Web-Enabled Simulation (WES) bots that emulate bad human behavior and then engineers use this data to determine the best correctives.

Privacy and location-based services

Increasingly, mobile devices facilitate location tracking.  This creates user privacy problems.  A user's location and preferences constitute personal information.  Their improper use violates that user's privacy.  A recent MIT study by de Montjoye et al. showed that 4 spatio-temporal points, approximate places and times, are enough to uniquely identify 95% of 1.5M people in a mobility database. The study
further shows that these constraints hold even when the resolution of the dataset is low. Therefore, even coarse or blurred datasets provide little anonymity.

Several methods to protect user privacy in location-based services have been proposed, including the use of anonymizing servers and blurring of information. Methods to quantify privacy have also been proposed, to calculate the equilibrium between the benefit of providing accurate location information and the drawbacks of risking personal privacy.

Advertising on mobile devices
When the internet was first introduced, the internet became the predominant medium of advertising, shifting from newspapers and magazines. With the growth of digital advertisements, people began to be tracked using HTTP cookies, and this data was used to target relevant audiences. Since the introduction of iPhones and Androids, data brokers were also planted within apps, for further tracking. Since the growth of cookies, resulting in a $350 billion digital industry especially focused on mobile devices, digital privacy has become the main source of concern for many mobile users, especially with the rise of privacy scandals, such as the Cambridge Analytica Scandal. Recently, Apple has introduced features that prohibit advertisers from tracking a user's data without their consent, as seen with their implementation of pop-up notifications that let users decide the extent to which a company can track their behavior. Google has begun to roll out similar features, but concerns have risen about how a privacy-conscious internet will function without advertisers being able to use data from users as a form of capital. Apple has set a precedent implementing stricter crackdown on privacy, especially with their introduction of the pop-up feature, which has made it harder for businesses, especially small businesses, on other mediums, like Facebook to target relevant audiences, since these advertisers no longer have relevant data. Google, contrary to Apple, has remained relatively lax in its crackdown, supporting cookies until at least 2023, until a privacy-conscious internet solution is found.

Ethical controversies over location privacy
There have been scandals regarding location privacy. One instance was the scandal concerning AccuWeather, where it was revealed that AccuWeather was selling locational data. This consisted of a user's locational data, even if they opted out within Accuweather, which tracked users’ location. Accuweather sold this data to Reveal Mobile, a company that monetizes data related to a user's location.  Other international cases are similar to the Accuweather case. In 2017, a leaky API inside the McDelivery App exposed private data, which consisted of home addresses, of 2.2 million users   With the rise of such scandals, many large American technology companies such as Google, Apple, and Facebook have been subjected to hearings and pressure under the U.S. legislative system. In 2011, with the rise of locational technology, US Senator Al Franken wrote an open letter to Steve Jobs, noting the ability of iPhones and iPads to record and store users' locations in unencrypted files,  although Apple denied doing so.  This conflict has perpetuated further into 2021; a recent example being where the U.S. state of Arizona found in a court case that Google mislead its users and stored the location of users regardless of their location settings.

Metadata

The ability to do online inquiries about individuals has expanded dramatically over the last decade. Importantly, directly observed behavior, such as browsing logs, search queries, or contents of a public Facebook profile, can be automatically processed to infer secondary information about an individual, such as sexual orientation, political and religious views, race, substance use, intelligence, and personality.

In Australia, the Telecommunications (Interception and Access) Amendment (Data Retention) Act 2015 made a distinction between collecting the contents of messages sent between users and the metadata surrounding those messages.

Protection of privacy on the Internet

Covert collection of personally identifiable information has been identified as a primary concern by the U.S. Federal Trade Commission. Although some privacy advocates recommend the deletion of original and third-party HTTP cookies, Anthony Miyazaki, marketing professor at Florida International University and privacy scholar, warns that the "elimination of third-party cookie use by Web sites can be circumvented by cooperative strategies with third parties in which information is transferred after the Web site's use of original domain cookies." As of December 2010, the Federal Trade Commission is reviewing policy regarding this issue as it relates to behavioral advertising.

Legal right to privacy

Most countries give citizens rights to privacy in their constitutions. Representative examples of this include the Constitution of Brazil, which says "the privacy, private life, honor and image of people are inviolable"; the Constitution of South Africa says that "everyone has a right to privacy"; and the Constitution of the Republic of Korea says "the privacy of no citizen shall be infringed." The Italian Constitution also defines the right to privacy. Among most countries whose constitutions do not explicitly describe privacy rights, court decisions have interpreted their constitutions to intend to give privacy rights.

Many countries have broad privacy laws outside their constitutions, including Australia's Privacy Act 1988, Argentina's Law for the Protection of Personal Data of 2000, Canada's 2000 Personal Information Protection and Electronic Documents Act, and Japan's 2003 Personal Information Protection Law.

Beyond national privacy laws, there are international privacy agreements. The United Nations Universal Declaration of Human Rights says "No one shall be subjected to arbitrary interference with [their] privacy, family, home or correspondence, nor to attacks upon [their] honor and reputation." The Organisation for Economic Co-operation and Development published its Privacy Guidelines in 1980. The European Union's 1995 Data Protection Directive guides privacy protection in Europe. The 2004 Privacy Framework by the Asia-Pacific Economic Cooperation is a privacy protection agreement for the members of that organization.

Argument against legal protection of privacy
The argument against the legal protection of privacy is predominant in the US. The landmark US Supreme Court case, Griswold v. Connecticut, established a reasonable expectation to privacy. However, some conservative justices do not consider privacy to be a legal right, as when discussing the 2003 case, Lawrence v. Texas (539 U.S. 558), Supreme Court Justice Antonin Scalia did not consider privacy to be a right, and Supreme Court Justice Clarence Thomas argued that there is "no general right to privacy" in the U.S. Constitution in 2007. Many Republican interest groups and activists desire for appointed justices to be like Justice Thomas and Scalia since they uphold originalism, which indirectly helps strengthen the argument against the legal protection of privacy.

Free market vs consumer protection

Approaches to privacy can, broadly, be divided into two categories: free market or consumer protection.

One example of the free market approach is to be found in the voluntary OECD Guidelines on the Protection of Privacy and Transborder Flows of Personal Data. The principles reflected in the guidelines, free of legislative interference, are analyzed in an article putting them into perspective with concepts of the GDPR put into law later in the European Union.

In a consumer protection approach, in contrast, it is claimed that individuals may not have the time or knowledge to make informed choices, or may not have reasonable alternatives available. In support of this view, Jensen and Potts showed that most privacy policies are above the reading level of the average person.

By country

Australia

The Privacy Act 1988 is administered by the Office of the Australian Information Commissioner. The initial introduction of privacy law in 1998 extended to the public sector, specifically to Federal government departments, under the Information Privacy Principles. State government agencies can also be subject to state based privacy legislation. This built upon the already existing privacy requirements that applied to telecommunications providers (under Part 13 of the Telecommunications Act 1997), and confidentiality requirements that already applied to banking, legal and patient / doctor relationships.

In 2008 the Australian Law Reform Commission (ALRC) conducted a review of Australian privacy law and produced a report titled "For Your Information". Recommendations were taken up and implemented by the Australian Government via the Privacy Amendment (Enhancing Privacy Protection) Bill 2012.

In 2015, the Telecommunications (Interception and Access) Amendment (Data Retention) Act 2015 was passed, to some controversy over its human rights implications and the role of media.

European Union

Although there are comprehensive regulations for data protection in the European Union, one study finds that despite the laws, there is a lack of enforcement in that no institution feels responsible to control the parties involved and enforce their laws. The European Union also champions the Right to be Forgotten concept in support of its adoption by other countries.

India
Since the introduction of the Aadhaar project in 2009, which resulted in all 1.2 billion Indians being associated with a 12-digit biometric-secured number.  Aadhaar has uplifted the poor in India by providing them with a form of  identity and preventing the fraud and waste of resources, as normally the government would not be able to allocate its resources to its intended assignees due to the ID issues . With the rise of Aadhaar, India has debated whether Aadhaar violates an individual's privacy and whether any organization should have access to an individual's digital profile, as the Aadhaar card became associated with other economic sectors, allowing for the tracking of individuals by both public and private bodies. Aadhaar databases have suffered from security attacks as well and the project was also met with mistrust regarding the safety of the social protection infrastructures.  In 2017, where the Aadhar was challenged, the Indian Supreme Court declared privacy as a human right, but postponed the decision regarding the constitutionality of Aadhaar for another bench. In September 2018, the Indian Supreme Court determined that the Aadhaar project did not violate the legal right to privacy.

United Kingdom

In the United Kingdom, it is not possible to bring an action for invasion of privacy. An action may be brought under another tort (usually breach of confidence) and privacy must then be considered under EC law. In the UK, it is sometimes a defence that disclosure of private information was in the public interest. There is, however, the Information Commissioner's Office (ICO), an independent public body set up to promote access to official information and protect personal information. They do this by promoting good practice, ruling on eligible complaints, giving information to individuals and organisations, and taking action when the law is broken. The relevant UK laws include: Data Protection Act 1998; Freedom of Information Act 2000; Environmental Information Regulations 2004; Privacy and Electronic Communications Regulations 2003. The ICO has also provided a "Personal Information Toolkit" online which explains in more detail the various ways of protecting privacy online.

United States

Although the US Constitution does not explicitly include the right to privacy, individual as well as locational privacy may be implicitly granted by the Constitution under the 4th Amendment. The Supreme Court of the United States has found that other guarantees have penumbras that implicitly grant a right to privacy against government intrusion, for example in Griswold v. Connecticut and Roe v. Wade. Dobbs v. Jackson Women's Health Organization later overruled Roe v. Wade, with Supreme Court Justice Clarence Thomas characterizing Griswold's penumbral argument as having a "facial absurdity", casting doubt on the validity of a constitutional right to privacy in the United States and of previous decisions relying on it. In the United States, the right of freedom of speech granted in the First Amendment has limited the effects of lawsuits for breach of privacy. Privacy is regulated in the US by the Privacy Act of 1974, and various state laws. The Privacy Act of 1974 only applies to federal agencies in the executive branch of the federal government. Certain privacy rights have been established in the United States via legislation such as the Children's Online Privacy Protection Act (COPPA), the Gramm–Leach–Bliley Act (GLB), and the Health Insurance Portability and Accountability Act (HIPAA).

Unlike the EU and most EU-member states, the US does not recognize the right to privacy of non-US citizens. The UN's Special Rapporteur on the right to privacy, Joseph A. Cannataci, criticized this distinction.

Conceptions of privacy

Privacy as contextual integrity

The theory of contextual integrity defines privacy as an appropriate information flow, where appropriateness, in turn, is defined as conformance with legitimate, informational norms specific to social contexts.

Right to be let alone
In 1890, the United States jurists Samuel D. Warren and Louis Brandeis wrote "The Right to Privacy", an article in which they argued for the "right to be let alone", using that phrase as a definition of privacy. This concept relies on the theory of natural rights and focuses on protecting individuals. The citation was a response to recent technological developments, such as photography, and sensationalist journalism, also known as yellow journalism.

There is extensive commentary over the meaning of being "let alone", and among other ways, it has been interpreted to mean the right of a person to choose seclusion from the attention of others if they wish to do so, and the right to be immune from scrutiny or being observed in private settings, such as one's own home. Although this early vague legal concept did not describe privacy in a way that made it easy to design broad legal protections of privacy, it strengthened the notion of privacy rights for individuals and began a legacy of discussion on those rights in the US.

Limited access
Limited access refers to a person's ability to participate in society without having other individuals and organizations collect information about them.

Various theorists have imagined privacy as a system for limiting access to one's personal information. Edwin Lawrence Godkin wrote in the late 19th century that "nothing is better worthy of legal protection than private life, or, in other words, the right of every man to keep his affairs to himself, and to decide for himself to what extent they shall be the subject of public observation and discussion." Adopting an approach similar to the one presented by Ruth Gavison Nine years earlier, Sissela Bok said that privacy is "the condition of being protected from unwanted access by others—either physical access, personal information, or attention."

Control over information
Control over one's personal information is the concept that "privacy is the claim of individuals, groups, or institutions to determine for themselves when, how, and to what extent information about them is communicated to others." Generally, a person who has consensually formed an interpersonal relationship with another person is not considered "protected" by privacy rights with respect to the person they are in the relationship with. Charles Fried said that "Privacy is not simply an absence of information about us in the minds of others; rather it is the control we have over information about ourselves. Nevertheless, in the era of big data, control over information is under pressure.

States of privacy 
Alan Westin defined four states—or experiences—of privacy: solitude, intimacy, anonymity, and reserve. Solitude is a physical separation from others; Intimacy is a "close, relaxed; and frank relationship between two or more individuals" that results from the seclusion of a pair or small group of individuals. Anonymity is the "desire of individuals for times of 'public privacy.'" Lastly, reserve is the "creation of a psychological barrier against unwanted intrusion"; this creation of a psychological barrier requires others to respect an individual's need or desire to restrict communication of information concerning themself.

In addition to the psychological barrier of reserve, Kirsty Hughes identified three more kinds of privacy barriers: physical, behavioral, and normative. Physical barriers, such as walls and doors, prevent others from accessing and experiencing the individual. (In this sense, "accessing" an individual includes accessing personal information about them.) Behavioral barriers communicate to others—verbally, through language, or non-verbally, through personal space, body language, or clothing—that an individual does not want the other person to access or experience them. Lastly, normative barriers, such as laws and social norms, restrain others from attempting to access or experience an individual.

Secrecy
Privacy is sometimes defined as an option to have secrecy. Richard Posner said that privacy is the right of people to "conceal information about themselves that others might use to their disadvantage".

In various legal contexts, when privacy is described as secrecy, a conclusion is reached: if privacy is secrecy, then rights to privacy do not apply for any information which is already publicly disclosed. When privacy-as-secrecy is discussed, it is usually imagined to be a selective kind of secrecy in which individuals keep some information secret and private while they choose to make other information public and not private.

Personhood and autonomy
Privacy may be understood as a necessary precondition for the development and preservation of personhood. Jeffrey Reiman defined privacy in terms of a recognition of one's ownership of their physical and mental reality and a moral right to self-determination. Through the "social ritual" of privacy, or the social practice of respecting an individual's privacy barriers, the social group communicates to developing children that they have exclusive moral rights to their bodies—in other words, moral ownership of their body. This entails control over both active (physical) and cognitive appropriation, the former being control over one's movements and actions and the latter being control over who can experience one's physical existence and when.

Alternatively, Stanley Benn defined privacy in terms of a recognition of oneself as a subject with agency—as an individual with the capacity to choose. Privacy is required to exercise choice. Overt observation makes the individual aware of himself or herself as an object with a "determinate character" and "limited probabilities." Covert observation, on the other hand, changes the conditions in which the individual is exercising choice without his or her knowledge and consent.

In addition, privacy may be viewed as a state that enables autonomy, a concept closely connected to that of personhood. According to Joseph Kufer, an autonomous self-concept entails a conception of oneself as a "purposeful, self-determining, responsible agent" and an awareness of one's capacity to control the boundary between self and other—that is, to control who can access and experience him or her and to what extent. Furthermore, others must acknowledge and respect the self's boundaries—in other words, they must respect the individual's privacy.

The studies of psychologists such as Jean Piaget and Victor Tausk show that, as children learn that they can control who can access and experience them and to what extent, they develop an autonomous self-concept. In addition, studies of adults in particular institutions, such as Erving Goffman's study of "total institutions" such as prisons and mental institutions, suggest that systemic and routinized deprivations or violations of privacy deteriorate one's sense of autonomy over time.

Self-identity and personal growth 
Privacy may be understood as a prerequisite for the development of a sense of self-identity. Privacy barriers, in particular, are instrumental in this process. According to Irwin Altman, such barriers "define and limit the boundaries of the self" and thus "serve to help define [the self]." This control primarily entails the ability to regulate contact with others. Control over the "permeability" of the self's boundaries enables one to control what constitutes the self and thus to define what is the self.

In addition, privacy may be seen as a state that fosters personal growth, a process integral to the development of self-identity. Hyman Gross suggested that, without privacy—solitude, anonymity, and temporary releases from social roles—individuals would be unable to freely express themselves and to engage in self-discovery and self-criticism. Such self-discovery and self-criticism contributes to one's understanding of oneself and shapes one's sense of identity.

Intimacy
In a way analogous to how the personhood theory imagines privacy as some essential part of being an individual, the intimacy theory imagines privacy to be an essential part of the way that humans have strengthened or intimate relationships with other humans. Because part of human relationships includes individuals volunteering to self-disclose most if not all personal information, this is one area in which privacy does not apply.

James Rachels advanced this notion by writing that privacy matters because "there is a close connection between our ability to control who has access to us and to information about us, and our ability to create and maintain different sorts of social relationships with different people." Protecting intimacy is at the core of the concept of sexual privacy, which law professor Danielle Citron argues should be protected as a unique form of privacy.

Physical privacy
Physical privacy could be defined as preventing "intrusions into one's physical space or solitude." An example of the legal basis for the right to physical privacy is the U.S. Fourth Amendment, which guarantees "the right of the people to be secure in their persons, houses, papers, and effects, against unreasonable searches and seizures".

Physical privacy may be a matter of cultural sensitivity, personal dignity, and/or shyness. There may also be concerns about safety, if, for example one is wary of becoming the victim of crime or stalking. There are different things that can be prevented to protect one's physical privacy, including people watching (even through recorded images) one's intimate behaviours or body parts and unhautorized access to one's personal possessions or places. Examples of possible efforts used to avoid the former, especially for modesty reasons, are clothes, walls, fences, privacy screens, cathedral glass, window coverings, etc.

Organizational
Government agencies, corporations, groups/societies and other organizations may desire to keep their activities or secrets from being revealed to other organizations or individuals, adopting various security practices and controls in order to keep private information confidential. Organizations may seek legal protection for their secrets. For example, a government administration may be able to invoke executive privilege or declare certain information to be classified, or a corporation might attempt to protect valuable proprietary information as trade secrets.

Privacy self-synchronization
Privacy self-synchronization is a hypothesized mode by which the stakeholders of an enterprise privacy program spontaneously contribute collaboratively to the program's maximum success. The stakeholders may be customers, employees, managers, executives, suppliers, partners or investors. When self-synchronization is reached, the model states that the personal interests of individuals toward their privacy is in balance with the business interests of enterprises who collect and use the personal information of those individuals.

An individual right

David Flaherty believes networked computer databases pose threats to privacy. He develops 'data protection' as an aspect of privacy, which involves "the collection, use, and dissemination of personal information". This concept forms the foundation for fair information practices used by governments globally. Flaherty forwards an idea of privacy as information control, "[i]ndividuals want to be left alone and to exercise some control over how information about them is used".

Richard Posner and Lawrence Lessig focus on the economic aspects of personal information control. Posner criticizes privacy for concealing information, which reduces market efficiency. For Posner, employment is selling oneself in the labour market, which he believes is like selling a product. Any 'defect' in the 'product' that is not reported is fraud. For Lessig, privacy breaches online can be regulated through code and law. Lessig claims "the protection of privacy would be stronger if people conceived of the right as a property right", and that "individuals should be able to control information about themselves".

A collective value and a human right

There have been attempts to establish privacy as one of the fundamental human rights, whose social value is an essential component in the functioning of democratic societies.

Priscilla Regan believes that individual concepts of privacy have failed philosophically and in policy. She supports a social value of privacy with three dimensions: shared perceptions, public values, and collective components. Shared ideas about privacy allows freedom of conscience and diversity in thought. Public values guarantee democratic participation, including freedoms of speech and association, and limits government power. Collective elements describe privacy as collective good that cannot be divided. Regan's goal is to strengthen privacy claims in policy making: "if we did recognize the collective or public-good value of privacy, as well as the common and public value of privacy, those advocating privacy protections would have a stronger basis upon which to argue for its protection".

Leslie Regan Shade argues that the human right to privacy is necessary for meaningful democratic participation, and ensures human dignity and autonomy. Privacy depends on norms for how information is distributed, and if this is appropriate. Violations of privacy depend on context. The human right to privacy has precedent in the United Nations Declaration of Human Rights: "Everyone has the right to freedom of opinion and expression; this right includes freedom to hold opinions without interference and to seek, receive and impart information and ideas through any media and regardless of frontiers." Shade believes that privacy must be approached from a people-centered perspective, and not through the marketplace.

Dr. Eliza Watt, Westminster Law School, University of Westminster in London, UK, proposes application of the International Human Right Law (IHRL) concept of “virtual control” as an approach to deal with extraterritorial mass surveillance by state intelligence agencies.Dr. Watt envisions the “virtual control” test, understood as a remote control over the individual's right to privacy of communications, where privacy is recognized under the ICCPR, Article 17. This, she contends, may help to close the normative gap that is being exploited by nation states.

Privacy paradox and economic valuation

The privacy paradox is a phenomenon in which online users state that they are concerned about their privacy but behave as if they were not. While this term was coined as early as 1998, it wasn't used in its current popular sense until the year 2000.

Susan B. Barnes similarly used the term privacy paradox to refer to the ambiguous boundary between private and public space on social media. When compared to adults, young people tend to disclose more information on social media. However, this does not mean that they are not concerned about their privacy. Susan B. Barnes gave a case in her article: in a television interview about Facebook, a student addressed her concerns about disclosing personal information online. However, when the reporter asked to see her Facebook page, she put her home address, phone numbers, and pictures of her young son on the page.

The privacy paradox has been studied and scripted in different research settings. Several studies have shown this inconsistency between privacy attitudes and behavior among online users. However, by now an increasing number of studies have also shown that there are significant and at times large correlations between privacy concerns and information sharing behavior, which speaks against the privacy paradox. A meta-analysis of 166 studies published on the topic reported an overall small but significant relation between privacy concerns and informations sharing or use of privacy protection measures. So although there are several individual instances or anecdotes where behavior appear paradoxical, on average privacy concerns and privacy behaviors seem to be related, and several findings question the general existence of the privacy paradox.

However, the relationship between concerns and behavior is likely only small, and there are several arguments that can explain why that is the case. According to the attitude-behavior gap, attitudes and behaviors are in general and in most cases not closely related. A main explanation for the partial mismatch in the context of privacy specifically is that users lack awareness of the risks and the degree of protection. Users may underestimate the harm of disclosing information online. On the other hand, some researchers argue that the mismatch comes from lack of technology literacy and from the design of sites.  For example, users may not know how to change their default settings even though they care about their privacy. Psychologists Sonja Utz and Nicole C. Krämer particularly pointed out that the privacy paradox can occur when users must trade-off between their privacy concerns and impression management.

Personal data have different personal and public value and are used for different purposes in citizen-state interactions, compared to customer-business interactions. Therefore, the privacy paradox in citizen state actions – for example in AI driven public services – urges a broader public debate on how governments can safeguard citizen privacy, beyond the economic valuation of personal data.

Research on irrational decision making

A study conducted by Susanne Barth and Menno D.T. de Jo demonstrates that decision making takes place on an irrational level, especially when it comes to mobile computing. Mobile applications in particular are often built up in such a way that spurs decision making that is fast and automatic without assessing risk factors. Protection measures against these unconscious mechanisms are often difficult to access while downloading and installing apps. Even with mechanisms in place to protect user privacy, users may not have the knowledge or experience to enable these mechanisms.

Users of mobile applications generally have very little knowledge of how their personal data are used. When they decide which application to download, they typically do not rely on the information provided by application vendors regarding the collection and use of personal data. Other research finds that users are much more likely to be swayed by cost, functionality, design, ratings, reviews and number of downloads than requested permissions, regardless of how important users may claim permissions to be when asked.

A study by Zafeiropoulou specifically examined location data, which is a form of personal information increasingly used by mobile applications. Their survey also found evidence that supports the existence of privacy paradox for location data.  Privacy risk perception in relation to the use of privacy-enhancing technologies survey data indicates that a high perception of privacy risk is an insufficient motivator for people to adopt privacy protecting strategies, while knowing they exist. It also raises a question on what the value of data is, as there is no equivalent of a stock-market for personal information.

The economic valuation of privacy

The willingness to incur a privacy risk is suspected to be driven by a complex array of factors including risk attitudes, personal value for private information, and general attitudes to privacy (which may be derived from surveys). One experiment aiming to determine the monetary value of several types of personal information indicated relatively low evaluations of personal information.

Information asymmetry

Users are not always given the tools to live up to their professed privacy concerns, and they are sometimes willing to trade private information for convenience, functionality, or financial gain, even when the gains are very small. One study suggests that people think their browser history is worth the equivalent of a cheap meal. Another finds that attitudes to privacy risk do not appear to depend on whether it is already under threat or not.

Inherent necessity for privacy violation

It is suggested by Andréa Belliger and David J. Krieger that the privacy paradox should not be considered a paradox, but more of a privacy dilemma, for services that cannot exist without the user sharing private data. However, the general public is typically not given the choice whether to share private data or not, making it difficult to verify any claim that a service truly cannot exist without sharing private data.

Privacy Calculus 
The privacy calculus model posits that two factors determine privacy behavior, namely privacy concerns (or perceived risks) and expected benefits. By now, the privacy calculus was supported by several studies, and it stands in direct contrast to the privacy paradox. Both perspectives can be consoled if they are understood from a more moderate position: Behavior is neither completely paradoxical nor completely logical, and the consistency between concerns and behavior depends on users, situations, or contexts.

Actions which reduce privacy
As with other conceptions of privacy, there are various ways to discuss what kinds of processes or actions remove, challenge, lessen, or attack privacy. In 1960 legal scholar William Prosser created the following list of activities which can be remedied with privacy protection:
 Intrusion into a person's private space, own affairs, or wish for solitude
 Public disclosure of personal information about a person which could be embarrassing for them to have revealed
 Promoting access to information about a person which could lead the public to have incorrect beliefs about them
 Encroaching someone's personality rights, and using their likeness to advance interests which are not their own

From 2004 to 2008, building from this and other historical precedents, Daniel J. Solove presented another classification of actions which are harmful to privacy, including collection of information which is already somewhat public, processing of information, sharing information, and invading personal space to get private information.

Collecting information
In the context of harming privacy, information collection means gathering whatever information can be obtained by doing something to obtain it. Examples include surveillance and interrogation. Another example is how consumers and marketers also collect information in the business context through facial recognition which has recently caused a concern for things such as privacy. There is currently research being done related to this topic.

Aggregating information
It can happen that privacy is not harmed when information is available, but that the harm can come when that information is collected as a set, then processed together in such a way that the collective reporting of pieces of information encroaches on privacy. Actions in this category which can lessen privacy include the following:
 data aggregation, which is connecting many related but unconnected pieces of information
 identification, which can mean breaking the de-identification of items of data by putting it through a de-anonymization process, thus making facts which were intended to not name particular people to become associated with those people
 insecurity, such as lack of data security, which includes when an organization is supposed to be responsible for protecting data instead suffers a data breach which harms the people whose data it held
 secondary use, which is when people agree to share their data for a certain purpose, but then the data is used in ways without the data donors’ informed consent
 exclusion is the use of a person's data without any attempt to give the person an opportunity to manage the data or participate in its usage

Information dissemination

Information dissemination is an attack on privacy when information which was shared in confidence is shared or threatened to be shared in a way that harms the subject of the information.

There are various examples of this. Breach of confidentiality is when one entity promises to keep a person's information private, then breaks that promise. Disclosure is making information about a person more accessible in a way that harms the subject of the information, regardless of how the information was collected or the intent of making it available. Exposure is a special type of disclosure in which the information disclosed is emotional to the subject or taboo to share, such as revealing their private life experiences, their nudity, or perhaps private body functions. Increased accessibility means advertising the availability of information without actually distributing it, as in the case of doxxing. Blackmail is making a threat to share information, perhaps as part of an effort to coerce someone. Appropriation is an attack on the personhood of someone, and can include using the value of someone's reputation or likeness to advance interests which are not those of the person being appropriated. Distortion is the creation of misleading information or lies about a person.

Invasion
Invasion of privacy, a subset of expectation of privacy, is a different concept from the collecting, aggregating, and disseminating information because those three are a misuse of available data, whereas invasion is an attack on the right of individuals to keep personal secrets. An invasion is an attack in which information, whether intended to be public or not, is captured in a way that insults the personal dignity and right to private space of the person whose data is taken.

Intrusion

An intrusion is any unwanted entry into a person's private personal space and solitude for any reason, regardless of whether data is taken during that breach of space. Decisional interference is when an entity somehow injects itself into the personal decision-making process of another person, perhaps to influence that person's private decisions but in any case doing so in a way that disrupts the private personal thoughts that a person has.

Examples of invasions of privacy
 In 2019, contract workers for Apple and Amazon reported being forced to continue listening to "intimate moments" captured on the companies' smart speakers in order to improve the quality of their automated speech recognition software.

Techniques to improve privacy

Similarly to actions which reduce privacy, there are multiple angles of privacy and multiple techniques to improve them to varying extents. When actions are done at an organizational level, they may be referred to as cybersecurity.

Encryption

Individuals can encrypt e-mails via enabling either two encryption protocols, S/MIME, which is built into companies like Apple or Outlook and thus most common, or PGP. The Signal messaging app, which encrypts messages so that only the recipient can read the message, is notable for being available on many mobile devices and implementing a form of perfect forward secrecy.

Anonymity

Anonymizing proxies or anonymizing networks like I2P and Tor can be used to prevent Internet service providers (ISP) from knowing which sites one visits and with whom one communicates, by hiding IP addresses and location, but does not necessarily protect a user from third party data mining. Anonymizing proxies are built into a user's device, in comparison to a Virtual Private Network (VPN), where users must download software. Using a VPN hides all data and connections that are exchanged between servers and a user's computer, resulting in the online data of the user being unshared and secure, providing a barrier between the user and their ISP, and is especially important to use when a user is connected to public Wi-Fi. However, users should understand that all their data does flow through the VPN's servers rather than the ISP. Users should decide for themselves if they wish to use either an anonymizing proxy or a VPN.

In a more non-technical sense, using incognito mode or private browsing mode will prevent a user's computer from saving history, Internet files, and cookies, but the ISP will still have access to the users' search history. Using anonymous search engines will not share a user's history, clicks, and will obstruct ad blockers.

User empowerment

Concrete solutions on how to solve paradoxical behavior still do not exist. Many efforts are focused on processes of decision making, like restricting data access permissions during application installation, but this would not completely bridge the gap between user intention and behavior. Susanne Barth and Menno D.T. de Jong believe that for users to make more conscious decisions on privacy matters, the design needs to be more user-oriented.

Other security measures
In a social sense, simply limiting the amount of personal information that users posts on social media could increase their security, which in turn makes it harder for criminals to perform identity theft.  Moreover, creating a set of complex passwords and using two-factor authentication can allow users to be less susceptible to their accounts being compromised when various data leaks occur. Furthermore, users should protect their digital privacy by using anti-virus software, which can block harmful viruses like a pop-up scanning for personal information on a users' computer.

Legal methods
Although there are laws that promote the protection of users, in some countries, like the U.S., there is no federal digital privacy law and privacy settings are essentially limited by the state of current enacted privacy laws. To further their privacy, users can start conversing with representatives, letting representatives know that privacy is a main concern, which in turn increases the likelihood of further privacy laws being enacted.

Privacy in non-human animals
David Attenborough, a biologist and natural historian, affirmed that gorillas "value their privacy" while discussing a brief escape by a gorilla in London Zoo.

Animals in zoos have been found to exhibit harmful or different behaviours due to the presence of visitors watching them:
Cotton-top tamarins in zoos engage in less social behaviours, including physical contact and sex, than ones in off-exhibit buildings.
Chimpanzees become more aggressive towards each other.
Lion-tailed macaques pace and bite themselves more in direct proportions to human visitors.
In one zoo, orangutans have been shown to cover their heads less as the density of visitors decreased.

Some studies have found in the contrary that being watched does not change non-human animals' behaviours, including covering faces.

See also
 Civil liberties
 Digital identity
 Global surveillance
 Identity theft in the United States
 Open data
 Open access
 Transparency
 Visual privacy
 Wikipedia's privacy policy – Wikimedia Foundation

References

Works cited

Further reading

External links

 Glenn Greenwald: Why privacy matters. Video on YouTube, provided by TED. Published 10 October 2014.
 International Privacy Index world map, The 2007 International Privacy Ranking, Privacy International (London).
 "Privacy" entry in the Stanford Encyclopedia of Philosophy.

 
Privacy law
Human rights
Identity management
Digital rights
Civil rights and liberties